Allerton and Hunts Cross is a Liverpool City Council Ward in the Garston and Halewood Parliamentary constituency. The ward was created for the 2004 municipal election from parts of the former Allerton ward and a small part of Woolton ward.

Councillors

 indicates seat up for re-election after boundary changes.

 indicates seat up for re-election.

 indicates change in affiliation.

 indicates seat up for re-election after casual vacancy.

Election results

Elections of the 2020s

Elections of the 2010s

Elections of the 2000s 

After the boundary change of 2004 the whole of Liverpool City Council faced election. Three Councillors were returned.

• italics denotes the sitting Councillor
• bold denotes the winning candidate

References

External links
 Council Ward profile
 LiverPages - Business, Charity and Trades Directory in Liverpool

Wards of Liverpool